Gleditsia × texana, the Texas honey locust, is a tree native to America. It is a naturally occurring hybrid of Gleditsia aquatica × Gleditsia triacanthos.

References

External links
 

texana
Plant nothospecies